A derby (also called gibson) is a style of boot or shoe characterized by quarters, with shoelace eyelets that are sewn on top of the vamp. This construction method, also known as "open lacing", contrasts with that of the Oxford shoe.

In American English the derby shoe may be referred to as a 'blucher', although technically the blucher is a different design of shoe where only eyelet tabs (not larger quarters) are sewn onto a single-piece vamp. 

In modern colloquial English the derby shoe may be referred to as 'bucks' when the upper is made of buckskin.

The derby became a popular sporting and hunting boot in the 1850s. By the turn of the 20th century the derby had become appropriate for wear in town.

See also
 List of shoe styles

References 

Shoes